Timyra aeolocoma is a moth in the family Lecithoceridae. It was described by Edward Meyrick in 1939. It is found in Malawi.

References

Endemic fauna of Malawi
Moths described in 1939
Timyra
Taxa named by Edward Meyrick